Penmetsa Subbaraju  is an Indian actor who predominantly works in Telugu cinema,as well as Tamil  Malayalam and Hindi cinema .Subbaraju has played a variety of roles, from negative to supporting characters. His most notable works include Amma Nanna O' Tamil Ammayi, Arya, Pokiri, Leader, Bbuddah... Hoga Terra Baap, Businessman, Mirchi, Baahubali 2: The Conclusion, Temper, Duvvada Jagannadham, Geetha Govindam, and Majili. Subbaraju is immensely popular in Japan for his role as Kumara Varma in the 2017 epic action film, Baahubali: The Conclusion.

Early life
Subbaraju was born in Bhimavaram, to Penmatsa Ramakrishnam Raju and Vijayalakshmi. Subbaraju did his education in D. N. R. College, Bhimavaram. He did his bachelor's degree in Mathematics before doing a computer course and joining Dell Computers, Hyderabad.

Career
Subbaraju's introduction to the cinema world was an accident. Director Krishna Vamsi's personal assistant asked Subbaraju to fix a computer issue for Krishna Vamsi's personal computer. After going to Krishna Vamsi's house, Subbaraju was then offered a small role in Krishna Vamsi's Khadgam.

Filmography

Telugu

Tamil

Kannada

Hindi

Malayalam

References

External links 

Telugu male actors
Living people
People from West Godavari district
Male actors in Telugu cinema
Indian male film actors
Male actors in Tamil cinema
Male actors in Malayalam cinema
Male actors in Kannada cinema
Male actors from Andhra Pradesh
21st-century Indian male actors
1977 births